The Carl Zuckmayer Medal is a literary prize given by the state of Rhineland-Palatinate in memory of Carl Zuckmayer. The medal itself was fashioned by state artist Otto Kallenbach. The prize is also given with a 30 liter cask of Nackenheimer wine from region Gunderlock, a type valued by Zuckmayer. The bestowal takes place on 18 January, the anniversary of Zuckmayer's death.

Winners

1979: Günther Fleckenstein
1980: Werner Hinz
1982: Georg Hensel
1984: Friedrich Dürrenmatt
1985: Ludwig Harig
1986: Dolf Sternberger
1987: Tankred Dorst
1988: Günter Strack
1989: Hanns Dieter Hüsch
1990: Martin Walser, Adolf Muschg, André Weckmann
1991: Albrecht Schöne
1992: Hilde Domin
1993: Hans Sahl
1994: Fred Oberhauser
1995: Grete Weil
1996: Mario Adorf
1997: Katharina Thalbach
1998: Harald Weinrich
1999: Eva-Maria Hagen for her 1998 letter exchange with Wolf Biermann "Eva und der Wolf"
2000: Peter Rühmkorf
2001: Mirjam Pressler
2002: Herta Müller
2003: Monika Maron and Wolf von Lojewski
2004: Edgar Reitz
2005: Thomas Brussig
2006: Armin Mueller-Stahl
2007: Udo Lindenberg
2008: Bodo Kirchhoff
2009: Volker Schlöndorff
2010: Emine Sevgi Özdamar 
2011: Hans Werner Kilz
2012: Uwe Timm
2013 Doris Dörrie
2014 Dieter Kühn
2015 Bruno Ganz
2016 Sven Regener
2017 Joachim Meyerhoff
2018 Yoko Tawada
2019 Robert Menasse
2020 Maren Kroymann
2021 Nora Gomringer
2022 Rafik Schami
2023 Nino Haratischwili

See also
 German literature
 List of literary awards
 List of poetry awards
 List of years in literature
 List of years in poetry

Notes

References
 (2004): 25 Jahre Carl-Zuckmayer-Medaille des Landes Rheinland-Pfalz 1979 bis 2004. Hrsg. von Kurt Beck. Frankfurt a.M.: Brandes & Apsel, ca. 130 S. 
 (1995):

External links
 Landesregierung Auszeichnungen: Carl Zuckmayer Medaille, Mediathek
 Kurt Beck verleiht Edgar Reitz die Carl Zuckmayer-Medaille 2004, Staatskanzlei Rheinland-Pfalz
 Carl-Zuckmayer-Medaille des Landes Rheinland-Pfalz 1997: Katharina Thalbach, Archive, Institut für pfälzische Geschichte und Volkskunde

Zuckmayer